Katrina Kaif (born 16 July 1983) is a British film actress and model who predominantly works in the Bollywood film industry. She has also appeared in Telugu and Malayalam films. Kaif is the recipient of more than 30 accolades including Stardust Awards, Zee Cine Awards, Screen Awards, IIFA Awards and 3 Filmfare Award nominations into her credit. Kaif has also topped various listings of India's most attractive people, being named "World's Sexiest Woman" by FHM 5 times, Eastern Eyes "Sexiest Asian Woman" 4 times, The Times of Indias "Most Desirable Woman" in 2010 and Peoples "Most Beautiful Woman" (India) in 2011.

Kaif's feature film debut was in Kaizad Gustad's box office flop Boom (2003), after which Kaif was written off due to her poor Hindi and thick British accent. She then starred as the titular character in the successful Telugu film Malliswari. After a small role in Sarkar (2005), Kaif found commercial success in Bollywood with the romantic comedy Maine Pyaar Kyun Kiya? (2005), in which Kaif received her first acting award — the Stardust Award for Breakthrough Performance – Female; this proved to be her breakthrough in Hindi cinema. In 2007, Kaif received critical praise for her performance in Namastey London (2007). This was followed by a string of box office hits in which Kaif was often cast in glamorous roles. In 2009, Kaif appeared in the drama thriller New York, earning her first nomination for the Filmfare Award for Best Actress. The same year, she appeared in the romantic comedy Ajab Prem Ki Ghazab Kahani. Both films earned her the Entertainer of the Year Award at Screen and the Best Actress - Popular Award at Stardust.

In 2010, Kaif featured in Raajneeti and Tees Maar Khan, receiving the Screen Award for Best Actress (Popular Choice) for both of them. In 2011, Kaif's performance as a free-spirited bride in Mere Brother Ki Dulhan earned her a second Filmfare nomination in the Best Actress category. She also received her second Screen Award for Best Actress (Popular Choice) for her roles in Jab Tak Hai Jaan (2012) and Ek Tha Tiger (2012). Her films Ek Tha Tiger, its 2017 sequel Tiger Zinda Hai, and Dhoom 3 (2013) rank among the highest-grossing Bollywood films of all time. Her roles in Zero (2018) and the commercially successful drama Bharat (2019) garnered her widespread critical praise; her portrayal of an alcoholic actress Babita Kumari in the former is one of the most acclaimed of her career, earning her a Zee Cine Award for Best Actor in a Supporting Role – Female and a third Filmfare Award nomination in the same category. 

Since Zero, critics have praised Kaif's maturity in her recent acting work, as well as her new creative focus to break the stereotype of only doing glamorous roles.

BIG Star Entertainment Awards

International Indian Film Academy Awards

Filmfare Awards

Filmfare Awards South

Screen Awards

Star Guild Awards

Stardust Awards

Zee Cine Awards

ETC Bollywood Business Awards

NDTV Indian of the Year

Other awards and recognition

References

External links 
 

Lists of awards received by Indian actor
Lists of awards received by British actor